Cargill House is a historic home located at Lima in Livingston County, New York. It was built about 1852 and is an elegant L-shaped, Greek Revival–style brick dwelling.  It features a 2-story, three-bay, side-hall main block with a pedimented gable oriented toward the street.  Also on the property is a -story carriage barn, two cut-stone hitching posts, and a spring-fed pond.

It was listed on the National Register of Historic Places in 1989.

References

Houses on the National Register of Historic Places in New York (state)
Greek Revival houses in New York (state)
Houses completed in 1852
Houses in Livingston County, New York
National Register of Historic Places in Livingston County, New York
1852 establishments in New York (state)